The Ricaurte Municipality is one of the nine municipalities (municipios) that makes up the Venezuelan state of Cojedes and, according to the 2011 census by the National Institute of Statistics of Venezuela, the municipality has a population of 12,657. The town of Libertad is the municipal seat of the Ricaurte Municipality. The municipality is named for Venezuelan independence hero Antonio Ricaurte.

Demographics
The Ricaurte Municipality, according to a 2007 population estimate by the National Institute of Statistics of Venezuela, has a population of 12,340 (up from 10,883 in 2000). This amounts to 4.1% of the state's population.

Government
The mayor of the Ricaurte Municipality is Ramón A Peralta Ruíz, elected on October 31, 2004, with 54% of the vote.   He replaced Violeta Montoya shortly after the elections.  The municipality is divided into two parishes; Libertad de Cojedes and El Amparo.

References

Municipalities of Cojedes (state)